Gabrielle "Goldiie" Nowee (born June 4, 1989) is a songwriter. She has worked with many songwriters including Diane Warren, Babyface, P.Diddy, and Tricky Stewart. In 2012, she was a finalist on the hit television show The Voice, and she has also appeared in a music video for 50 Cent. Goldiie is most known for her songwriting for Chris Brown, David Guetta, Christina Aguilera, K Camp, Busta Rhymes, Nipsey Hussle, Jesse McCartney, Luke James, G Eazy, Kehlani, TLC, Meek Mill, Jeremih, and Ty Dolla Sign. She is associated with the Universal Music Publishing Group.

Songwriting credits

  signifies background vocals

Discography

Songs
"Blue Laces" from The Marathon, Nipsey Hussle ft Goldiie
"Intoxicated" from X-Tra Laps, Nipsey Hussle ft Goldiee
"Westside" Algee Smith ft Goldiie
"Play" Big Freedia ft Goldiie
"Fuck What People Think" Rock Mafia ft Goldiie

Mixtape
The Gold Rush Part. 1 (2016)

Other appearances

References

Living people
American women singer-songwriters
American hip hop singers
American rhythm and blues singer-songwriters
Singers from Los Angeles
Place of birth missing (living people)
1989 births
21st-century American singers
21st-century American women singers
Singer-songwriters from California